Establishing a federal region south of Iraq, called Basra Federal Region (إقليم البصرة) is supported by a number of Iraqi political parties. The Iraqi constitution allows any province to become a region with independent powers.

In November 2008 Wael Abdul Latif, an Independent Islamist MP backed by tribal Sheikhs, submitted a petition to the Electoral Commission of Iraq signed by 34,800 people calling for a vote on a region of Iraq covering only the governorate of Basra. The Sadrist movement opposed the move, saying it was "playing with fire" as did the Islamic Dawa Party of Prime Minister Nouri al-Maliki. The Islamic Supreme Council of Iraq remained neutral, as it supports a nine-province Region covered the whole of southern Iraq. As the petition was signed by more than 2% of the population, the commission published an official request for signatures; if more than 10% of the population had signed it before 15 January 2009, a referendum would have been held within 15 days. In the event, the initiative failed to reach 10% and was struck down by the Electoral Commission. Backers accused the al-Maliki federal government of blocking their media campaign and appealed the decision to the Federal Court.

In September 2014 a number of locals in Basra participated in a demonstration near the headquarters of the local government in Basra, demanding the transfer of the province to a federal region.

As of early 2015, the majority of the political parties, which objected to the federal plans for Iraq on the pretext that they would lead to division, are now supporting the project. The Shia cleric, Ayatolla Sistani is said to disagree on establishing the Basra Region.

References

External links
Proposed flag of Basra Federal Region
Federalism debates in Iraq and the autonomy for Basra province

Politics of Iraq